Aja (pronounced like Asia) is the sixth studio album by the American jazz rock band Steely Dan. It was released on September 23, 1977, by ABC Records. Recording alongside nearly 40 musicians, band leaders Donald Fagen and Walter Becker pushed Steely Dan further into experimenting with different combinations of session players while pursuing longer, more sophisticated compositions and arrangements for the album.

The album peaked at number three on the US charts and number five in the UK, ultimately becoming Steely Dan's most commercially successful LP. It spawned a number of hit singles, including "Peg", "Deacon Blues", and "Josie". 

In July 1978, Aja won the Grammy Award for Best Engineered Recording – Non-Classical and received Grammy nominations for Album of the Year and Best Pop Performance by a Duo or Group with Vocals. It has since appeared frequently on professional rankings of the greatest albums, with critics and audiophiles applauding the album's high production standards. In 2010, the Library of Congress selected the album for preservation in the National Recording Registry for being "culturally, historically, or artistically significant."

Recording 
The album was produced by Steely Dan's longtime producer Gary Katz and features several leading session musicians. The eight-minute-long title track features a jazz-based chord progression and a solo by saxophonist Wayne Shorter. Becker did not perform on "Black Cow" or "Peg".

Title and packaging 
The album's title is pronounced like Asia. Donald Fagen has said the album was named for a Korean woman who married the brother of one of his high-school friends. The cover photo by Hideki Fujii features Japanese model and actress Sayoko Yamaguchi and was designed by Patricia Mitsui and Geoff Westen. The inside photos were taken by Walter Becker and Dorothy A. White.

Marketing and sales 
Aja was released on September 23, 1977 by ABC Records. In anticipation of the release, Katz urged the relatively private Fagen and Becker to raise their public profile, including a meeting with Irving Azoff for his services as their manager. Fagen expressed initial reservations at the time: "We were ready to go blissfully through life without a manager."

With Azoff's connections with record stores and the album being offered at a discounted price, Aja became "one of the season's hottest albums and by far Steely Dan's fastest-selling ever", according to Cameron Crowe in the December 1977 issue of Rolling Stone. Within three weeks of release, the album reached the top five of the Billboard 200, ultimately peaking at number three to become the band's highest-peaking album on the chart. It also reached number five on the UK albums chart. According to Billboard, it became the band's biggest hit and one of the first albums to be certified platinum.

When DTS attempted to make a 5.1 version, it was discovered that the multitrack masters for both "Black Cow" and the title track were missing. For this same reason, a multichannel SACD version was cancelled by Universal Music. Donald Fagen has offered a reward for the missing masters or any information that leads to their recovery.

Reception and legacy 

Reviewing in 1977 for Rolling Stone, Michael Duffy said that "the conceptual framework of [Steely Dan's] music has shifted from the pretext of rock & roll toward a smoother, awesomely clean and calculated mutation of various rock, pop and jazz idioms", while their lyrics "remain as pleasantly obtuse and cynical as ever". Duffy added that while the duo's "extreme intellectual self-consciousness" was beginning to show its limitations, the latter "may be precisely the quality that makes Walter Becker and Donald Fagen the perfect musical antiheroes for the Seventies." Robert Christgau of The Village Voice initially "hated" the record before he "realized that, unlike The Royal Scam, it was stretching me some", while noting that he was "grateful to find Fagen and Becker's collegiate cynicism in decline". However, he believed the band's preference for longer, more sophisticated songs "could turn into their fatal flaw". Greg Kot was also lukewarm toward the band's stylistic departure, later writing in the Chicago Tribune: "The clinical coldness first evidenced on The Royal Scam is perfected here. Longer, more languid songs replace the acerbic pithiness of old." Barry Walters was more receptive in a retrospective review for Rolling Stone, saying "rock has always excelled at embodying adolescent ache. But it's rare when rock captures the complications of adult sorrows almost purely with its sound."

Jazz historian Ted Gioia cites Aja as an example of Steely Dan "proving that pop-rock could equally benefit from a healthy dose of jazz" during their original tenure, which coincided with a period when rock musicians frequently experimented with jazz idioms and techniques. In the opinion of Pitchforks Amanda Petrusich, it is "as much a jazz record as a pop one", while Ben Ratliff from The New York Times says it "created a new standard for the relationship between jazz and rock, one that was basically irreproducible, by Steely Dan or anyone else ... a progressive jazz record with backbeats, a '70s hipster's extension of what had been Gil Evans's vision two decades earlier." In Dylan Jones' list of the best jazz albums for GQ, Aja ranked 62nd.

The album has been cited by music journalists as one of the best test recordings for audiophiles, due to its high production standards. Walters noted in his review "the album's surreal sonic perfection, its melodic and harmonic complexity - music so technically demanding its creators had to call in A-list session players to realize the sounds they heard in their heads but could not play, even on the instruments they had mastered." Reviewing Ajas 2007 all-analog LP reissue, Ken Kessler from Hi-Fi News & Record Review gave top marks to both recording and performance qualities, calling the album "sublime jazz-rock that hasn't aged at all - unless you consider 'intelligence' passe - it is everything you expected the painfully hip/cool Becker and Fagen to deliver."

Accolades 
Aja has frequently appeared on rankings of the greatest albums of all time. In 1991, France's Rock & Folk included Aja on a list of the 250 best albums released during the magazine's existence, beginning in 1966. In 1999, it was ranked 59th on the national Israeli newspaper Yedioth Ahronoths "Top 99 Albums of All Time". In 2000 it was voted number 118 in Colin Larkin's All Time Top 1000 Albums. In 2003, the album was inducted into the Grammy Hall of Fame and ranked number 145 on Rolling Stones "The 500 Greatest Albums of All Time" list, maintaining the rating in a 2012 revised list, before rising to number 63 in a 2020 reboot of the list. In 2006, Aja was included in the book 1001 Albums You Must Hear Before You Die. In 2010, the Library of Congress selected Aja for inclusion in the United States National Recording Registry based on its cultural, artistic or historical significance alongside De La Soul's 1989 debut album 3 Feet High and Rising which sampled the album as well. Based on such rankings, the aggregate website Acclaimed Music lists Aja as 95th most acclaimed album of the 1970s and the 318th most acclaimed album in history.

The singer Bilal names it among his 25 favorite albums, explaining that, "It's a great body of work. It seems very thought out from beginning to end, every song just had a certain vibe. The songwriting to the sound and the look of the album, the whole package was just very well thought out."

Classic Albums episode 
In 1999, Aja was covered for an episode of the British documentary series Classic Albums, featuring a song-by-song study of the album (the only omission being "I Got the News", which is played during the closing credits), interviews with Steely Dan co-founders Walter Becker and Donald Fagen (among others) plus new, live-in-studio versions of songs from the album. Becker and Fagen also play back several of the rejected guitar solos for "Peg", which were recorded before Jay Graydon produced the satisfactory take. Andy Gill, one of the other interviewees, said: "Jazz-rock was a fundamental part of the 70s musical landscape … [Steely Dan] wasn't rock or pop music with ideas above its station, and it wasn't jazzers slumming … it was a very well-forged alloy of the two – you couldn't separate the pop music from the jazz in their music." Discussing the album's sound, British musician Ian Dury said in the episode that he heard elements of legendary jazz musicians like Charlie Parker, Charles Mingus, and Art Blakey. "Well, Aja's got a sound that lifts your heart up, and it's the most consistent up-full, heart-warming … even though, it is a classic LA kinda sound", Dury explained. "You wouldn't think it was recorded anywhere else in the world. It's got California through its blood, even though they are boys from New York … They've got a skill that can make images that aren't puerile and don't make you think you've heard it before … very 'Hollywood filmic' in a way, the imagery is very imaginable, in a visual sense."

Yacht rock 

In retrospective appraisals, Aja has been discussed by music journalists as an important release in the development of yacht rock. For Spin in 2009, Chuck Eddy lists it among the genre's eight essential albums. Writing for uDiscoverMusic in 2019, Paul Sexton said that with the album, Steely Dan "announced their ever-greater exploration of jazz influences" that would lead to "their yacht-rock masterpiece" in 1980's Gaucho. Patrick Hosken from MTV News said that both Aja and Gaucho show how "great yacht rock is also more musically ambitious than it might seem, tying blue-eyed soul and jazz to funk and R&B". Aja was included in Vinyl Me, Please magazine's list of the 10 best yacht rock albums, with an accompanying essay that said: "Steely Dan’s importance to yacht rock can’t be overstated. … Arguably the Dan is smoothest on the 1980 smash Gaucho, but Aja finds Walter Becker and Donald Fagen comfortably hitting a middle-ground stride … as a mainstream hit factory while remaining expansive and adventurous". John Lawler from Something Else! said, "The song and performance that best exemplifies the half-time, funky, laid (way) back in the beat shuffle within the jazz-pop environment of the mid- to late- 70s can be found on 'Home at Last.' Bernard “Pretty” Purdie feeds off Chuck Rainey’s bass with righteous grooves and masterful off-beat fills with alacrity in this tight band favorite."

Track listing 
All songs written by Walter Becker and Donald Fagen.

Personnel
Adapted from liner notes.

Side A
"Black Cow"
Donald Fagen – lead vocals, synthesizer
Paul Humphrey – drums
Chuck Rainey – bass guitar
Victor Feldman – Fender Rhodes
Joe Sample – clavinet
Larry Carlton – guitar
Tom Scott – tenor saxophone
Clydie King, Sherlie Matthews, Venetta Fields, Rebecca Louis – backing vocals
"Aja"
Donald Fagen – lead vocals, synthesizer, police whistle, backing vocals
Steve Gadd – drums
Chuck Rainey – bass guitar
Larry Carlton, Walter Becker, Denny Dias – guitars
Joe Sample – Fender Rhodes
Michael Omartian – piano
Victor Feldman – percussion
Wayne Shorter – tenor saxophone
Timothy B. Schmit – backing vocals
"Deacon Blues"
Donald Fagen – lead vocals, synthesizer
Bernard Purdie – drums
Walter Becker – bass guitar
Larry Carlton, Lee Ritenour – guitars
Victor Feldman – Fender Rhodes
Pete Christlieb – tenor saxophone
Clydie King, Sherlie Matthews, Venetta Fields – backing vocals
Dean Parks - acoustic guitar
Rhythm arrangement by Larry Carlton
 
Side B
"Peg"
Donald Fagen – lead vocals
Rick Marotta – drums
Chuck Rainey – bass guitar
Paul Griffin – Fender Rhodes, backing vocals
Don Grolnick – clavinet
Steve Khan – guitar
Jay Graydon – guitar solo
Victor Feldman, Gary Coleman – percussion
Tom Scott – Lyricon
Michael McDonald – backing vocals
"Home at Last"
Donald Fagen – lead vocals, synthesizer, backing vocals
Bernard Purdie – drums
Chuck Rainey – bass guitar
Larry Carlton – guitar
Walter Becker – guitar solo
Victor Feldman – piano, vibraphone
Tim Schmit – backing vocals
"I Got the News"
Donald Fagen – lead vocals, synthesizers
Ed Greene – drums
Chuck Rainey – bass guitar
Victor Feldman – piano, vibraphone, percussion
Dean Parks – guitar
Walter Becker, Larry Carlton – guitar solos
Michael McDonald, Clydie King, Venetta Fields, Sherlie Matthews, Rebecca Louis – backing vocals
"Josie"
Donald Fagen – lead vocals, synthesizers, backing vocals
Jim Keltner – drums, percussion
Chuck Rainey – bass guitar
Victor Feldman – Fender Rhodes
Larry Carlton, Dean Parks – guitars
Walter Becker – guitar solo
Tim Schmit – backing vocals

Tom Scott – horn arrangements
Jim Horn, Bill Perkins, Plas Johnson, Jackie Kelso – saxophones, flutes
Chuck Findley, Lou McCreary, Dick Hyde – brass

Production
 Stephen Diener [ABC Records] – executive producer
 Gary Katz – producer
 Roger Nichols, Elliot Scheiner, Al Schmitt, Bill Schnee – engineers
 Joe Bellamy, Lenise Bent, Ken Klinger, Ron Pangaliman, Ed Rack, Linda Tyler – assistant engineers
 Bernie Grundman – mastering
 Barbara Miller – production coordination
 Dinky Dawson – sound consultant
 Daniel Levitin – consultant
 Oz Studios, Vartan Reissue – art direction
 Patricia Mitsui, Geoff Westen – design
 Hideki Fujii (cover photo), Walter Becker, Dorothy A. White – photography
 Walter Becker, Donald Fagen – liner notes

Outtakes 
The sessions for Aja produced several outtakes, including "The Bear" and “Stand by the Seawall”, the latter including an alternate version that is a complete different song, sharing only the name. The songs were never officially released, but “The Bear” would later be played live on their 2011 Shuffle Diplomacy tour.

Awards 
Grammy Awards

Charts

Weekly charts

Year-end charts

Certifications

References

Further reading

External links 
 
 
 , courtesy of The Museum of Classic Chicago Television
 
 Official YouTube playlist

Steely Dan albums
ABC Records albums
1977 albums
Albums produced by Gary Katz
United States National Recording Registry recordings
Grammy Hall of Fame Award recipients
Grammy Award for Best Engineered Album, Non-Classical
United States National Recording Registry albums